This is not to be confused of Machap Baru of Melaka.

Machap is a mukim in Kluang District, Johor, Malaysia. It is known for its pottery factories and though it has some pottery shops, there are not as many as in Ayer Hitam.

Geography

The mukim spans over an area of 118 km2.

Demographics
The total population of the mukim is 5,317 people. 45 per cent of the constituency's population is Chinese, 38 per cent Malay, 15 per cent Indian and two per cent other races.

Transportation

Road
The town is accessible by bus from Larkin Sentral (2, 888) in Johor Bahru.

References

Mukims of Kluang District